Laura M. Montoya is an American politician from New Mexico. A member of the Democratic Party, she is the New Mexico State Treasurer.

Early life and career
Montoya was born in Las Vegas, New Mexico. She lived in both San Miguel and Mora counties while growing up.

Montoya earned a bachelor's degree in political science and psychology from New Mexico Highlands University. She began working in government for state Senator Pete Campos and then worked for U.S. Senator Jeff Bingaman as a constituent services representative. Meanwhile, she earned a Master of Public Affairs from New Mexico Highlands University.

Political career
In 2012, Montoya was elected as the treasurer for Sandoval County, New Mexico. She was reelected in 2016. She lost the Democratic Party nomination to Teresa Leger Fernandez.

In August 2021, with New Mexico State Treasurer Tim Eichenberg prevented from running for a third term due to term limits, Montoya announced her candidacy to succeed him in the 2022 election. She faced Heather Benavidez, Eichenberg's chief of staff, in the Democratic primary election. Montoya won the nomination and faced Harry Montoya, a county commissioner from Santa Fe County and the Republican Party nominee, in the general election. She won the election with 53 percent of the vote.

Personal life
Montoya lives in Rio Rancho, New Mexico. In March 2014, she was charged with aggravated battery after allegedly punching and biting her ex-boyfriend that February. She claimed that she acted in self-defense. The case was dismissed in June when her ex-boyfriend did not attend court.

References

External links

 

 

County officials in New Mexico
Living people
New Mexico Democrats
New Mexico Highlands University alumni
People from Las Vegas, New Mexico
State treasurers of New Mexico
Women in New Mexico politics
Year of birth missing (living people)